Stenka Razin is the first finished Russian narrative film. The 10-minute silent film is a fictionalized account of episodes from the life of Stenka Razin. Mikhail Ippolitov-Ivanov wrote a score for it.

External links
 
 Stenka Razin on YouTube:
 Music a singing of the folk song "Stenka Razin", no subtitles: https://m.youtube.com/watch?v=hIhB20KTWzA (5:47)
 Orchestral music, no subtitles: https://youtube.com/watch?v=xuwdAmXRY28 (8:36)
 Different orchestral music, no subtitles: https://youtube.com/watch?v=XB7WZ_0Ij9I (8:16)
 Different orchestral music, English subtitles: https://youtube.com/watch?v=ScVcSP47_RY (6:16)
 No music, English subtitles: https://youtube.com/watch?v=VnxMtEMDjfM (8:17)
 With Tchaikovsky's 1812 Overture, considerable added text in Italian: https://youtube.com/watch?v=6h8j8Q2yg_Y (14:59)

1908 films
1908 short films
Russian black-and-white films
Films of the Russian Empire
Articles containing video clips
Russian silent short films